Ralphie is a masculine given name, often a diminutive form (hypocorism) of Ralph. It may refer to:

 Ralphie May (1972-2017), American stand-up comedian and actor
 Ralph "Ralphie" Cifaretto, a character on the TV series The Sopranos
 Ralphie Tennelli, a character on the TV series The Magic Schoolbus and The Magic School Bus Rides Again
 Ralphie the Buffalo, mascot of the University of Colorado Buffaloes

See also
 Ralph Scopo (1932-1993), New York mobster nicknamed "Little Ralphie"

English masculine given names
English-language masculine given names
Hypocorisms